Abdul Latif was a Bangladesh Awami League politician and the former Member of Parliament of Brahmanbaria-5.

Career
Latif was a Mukti Bahini commander. He was elected to parliament from Brahmanbaria-5 as a Bangladesh Awami League candidate in 1996. He founded Nabinagar Pourashava and Nabinagar Mohila Degree College. He was the President of Nabinagar Upazila unit of Bangladesh Awami League.

Death
Latif died on 17 November 2001.

References

Awami League politicians
2001 deaths
7th Jatiya Sangsad members